Girl on the Road or Hitch-Hike (French: Les petits matins) is a 1962 French comedy film directed by Jacqueline Audry and starring Darry Cowl, Pierre Mondy, and Lino Ventura.

Cast
 Darry Cowl as Le journaliste  
 Pierre Mondy as Le manager  
 Lino Ventura as Le conducteur de car  
 Daniel Gélin as Le comédien  
 Robert Hossein as Le fou  
 Arletty as Gabrielle, maîtresse de Rameau  
 Pierre Brasseur as Achille Pipermint  
 Andréa Parisy as Une autostoppeuse  
 Fernand Gravey as L'homme à la cadillac  
 Claude Rich as L'homme de 30 ans  
 François Périer as L'homme de 40 ans  
 Agathe Aëms as Agathe  
 Gilbert Bécaud as Le pilote d'air france  
 Noël-Noël as Le baron  
 Bernard Blier as Rameau 
 Michel Le Royer as Le champion de tennis  
 Jean-Claude Brialy as Jean-Claude, le marchand de brosses  
 Francis Blanche as Le douanier  
 Joé Davray as Le motard #1  
 Philippe Clair as Le motard #2  
 Roger Coggio as Bobby, le boxeur  
 Huguette Duflos as La mère d'Édouard  
 Yves Gabrielli as Le camionneur  
 Jean Parédès as Le maître d'hôtel 
 Christian Pezey as Le scootériste  
 Pierre Repp as Le satyre  
 Véra Valmont as La barmaid 
 Henri Attal as Un spectateur à la boxe  
 Maurice Auzel as Un boxeur  
 Michèle Bardollet as La serveuse  
 Claude Caroll as La serveuse au restauroute  
 Dominique Zardi as Un spectateur à la boxe

References

Bibliography 
 Sharon Smith. Women who Make Movies. Hopkinson and Blake, 1975.

External links 
 

1962 films
1962 comedy films
French comedy films
1960s French-language films
Films directed by Jacqueline Audry
Gaumont Film Company films
1960s French films